Lyn Yvonne Abramson (born February 7, 1950) is a professor of psychology at the University of Wisconsin–Madison. She was born in Benson, Minnesota. She took her undergraduate degree at the University of Wisconsin–Madison in 1972 before attaining her Ph.D. in clinical psychology at University of Pennsylvania in 1978.

Achievements
As a clinical psychologist, her main areas of research interest have been exploring vulnerability to major depressive disorder and psychobiological and cognitive approaches to depression, bipolar disorder, and eating disorders. She was the senior author of the paper "Learned Helplessness in Humans: Critique and Reformulation" published in the Journal of Abnormal Psychology, 1978, proposing a link between a particular explanatory style and depression.

With her co-authors William T. L. Cox, Patricia Devine, and Steven D. Hollon, she proposed the integrated perspective on prejudice and depression, which combines cognitive theories of depression with cognitive theories of prejudice. Lyn and her coauthors propose that many cases of depression may be caused by prejudice from the self or from another person. "This depression caused by prejudice – which the researchers call deprejudice — can occur at many levels. In the classic case, prejudice causes depression at the societal level (e.g., Nazis’ prejudice causing Jews’ depression), but this causal chain can also occur at the interpersonal level (e.g., an abuser's prejudice causing an abusee's depression), or even at the intrapersonal level, within a single person (e.g., a man's prejudice against himself causing his depression)."

Along with her frequent collaborator Lauren Alloy, Abramson was awarded the James McKeen Cattell Fellow Award for 2008–2009 by the Association for Psychological Science. She is on the Institute for Scientific Information list of highly cited researchers.

Books
Abramson, L. Y., Editor (1988). Social cognition and clinical psychology: A synthesis. New York: Guilford.

Book chapters
Abramson, L. Y., Alloy, L. B., Hankin, B. L., Haeffel, G. J., Gibb, B. E., & MacCoon, D. G. (2002). Cognitive vulnerability-stress models of depression in a self-regulatory and psychobiological context. In I.H. Gotlib & C.L. Hammen (Eds.), Handbook of depression. New York: Guilford
Abramson, L. Y., Alloy, L. B., & Panzarella, C. C. (2002). Depression. In Encyclopedia of Cognitive Science. London: Macmillan.
Abramson, L. Y., Bardone, A. M., Vohs, K. D., Joiner, T. E., & Heatherton, T. F. (2002). The Paradox of perfectionism and binge eating: Toward a resolution. In L.B. Alloy and J.H. Riskind (Eds.), Cognitive vulnerability to emotional disorders. Hillsdale, N.J.: Erlbaum.
Alloy, L. B., & Abramson, L. Y. (In Press). Cyclothymic personality. (2002) In W.E. Craighead and C.B. Nemeroff (Eds.), Concise Corsini Encyclopedia of Psychology and Behavioral Science. New York: Wiley & Sons, Inc.
Alloy, L. B., Abramson, L. Y., Safford, S. M., & Gibb, B. E. (2002) The Cognitive Vulnerability to Depression (CVD) Project: Current findings and future directions. In L.B. Alloy and J.H. Riskind (Eds.), Cognitive vulnerability to emotional disorders. Hillsdale, N.J.: Erlbaum.
Spasojevic, J., Alloy, L. B., Abramson, L. Y., MacCoon, D., & Robinson, M. S. (In Press). Reactive rumination: Consequences, mechanisms, and developmental antecedents. In C. Papageorgiou and A. Wells (Eds.), Depressive rumination: Nature, theory, and treatment. New York: Wiley. (2002)
Abramson, L. Y., Alloy, L. B., Hankin, B. L., Clements, C. M., Zhu, L., Hogan, M. E., & Whitehouse, W. G. (2000). Optimistic cognitive styles and invulnerability to depression. In J. Gillham (Ed.), The science of optimism and hope (pp. 75–98). Philadelphia: Templeton Foundation
Abramson, L. Y., Alloy, L. B., Hogan, M. E., Whitehouse, W. G., Gibb, B. E., Hankin, B. L., & Cornette, M. M. (2000). The hopelessness theory of suicidality. In T.E. Joiner and M.D. Rudd (Eds.), Suicide science: Expanding boundaries (pp. 17–32). Boston: Kluwer Academic Publishing
Alloy, L. B., & Abramson, L. Y. (2000). Cyclothymic personality. In W.E. Craighead and C.B. Nemeroff (Eds.), The Corsini Encyclopedia of psychology and neuroscience. (3rd edition, Vol. 1, pp. 417–418). New York: Wiley & Sons.
Alloy, L. B., Abramson, L. Y., & Chiara, A. M. (2000). On the mechanisms by which optimism promotes positive mental and physical health: A commentary on Aspinwall. In J. Gillham (Ed.), The science of optimism and hope (pp. 201–212). Philadelphia: Templeton Foundation
Cornette, M. M., Abramson, L. Y., & Bardone, A. M. (2000). Toward an integrated theory of suicidal behaviors: Merging the hopelessness, self-discrepancy, and escape theories. In T.E. Joiner and M.D. Rudd (Eds.), Suicide science: Expanding boundaries (pp. 43–66). Boston: Kluwer Academic Publishing
Alloy, L. B., Abramson, L. Y., Raniere, D., & Dyller, I. (1999). Research methods in adult psychopathology. In P.C. Kendall, J.N. Butcher, & G.N. Holmbeck (Eds.), Handbook of research methods in clinical psychology (2nd edition, pp. 466–498). New York: Wiley
Gotlib, I. H., & Abramson, L. Y. (1999). Attributional theories of emotion. In T. Dagleish & M. Power (Eds.), The handbook of cognition and emotion (pp. 613–636). Chichester, England: Wiley
Panzarella, C., Alloy, L. B., Abramson, L. Y., & Klein, K. (1999). Cognitive contributions to mental illness and mental health. In F.T. Durso, R.S., Nickerson, R.W. Schvaneveldt, S.T. Dumais, & M.T.H. Chi (Eds.), Handbook of applied cognition (pp. 725–755). New York: Wiley
Abramson, L. Y., Alloy, L. B., & Metalsky, G. I. (1995). Hopelessness depression. In G. Buchanan and M.E.P. Seligman (Eds.), Explanatory style. Hillsdale, N.J.: Erlbaum
Abramon, L. Y., Metalsky, G. I., & Alloy, L. B. (1993). Hopelessness. In C.G. Costello (Ed.), Symptoms of depression. New York: Wiley
Rose, D. T., & Abramson, L. Y. (1992). Developmental predictors of depressive cognitive style: Research and theory. In D. Cicchetti and S. Toth (Eds.), Rochester Symposium on Developmental Psychopathology, Vol. IV. Hillsdale, N.J.: Erlbaum
Abramson, L. Y., & Alloy, L. B. (1990). Search for the "Negative Cognition" subtype of depression. In C.D. McCann and N.S. Endler (Eds.), Depression: New directions in theory, research, and practice. Toronto: Wall and Thompson
Abramson, L. Y., Alloy, L. B., & Metalsky, G. I. (1990). The hopelessness theory of depression: Current status and future directions. In N. Stein (Ed.), University of Chicago Symposium on Emotion. Hillsdale, N.J.: Erlbaum
Alloy, L. B., Albright, J. S., Abramson, L. Y., & Dykman, B. M. (1990). Depressive realism and nondepressive optimistic illusions: The role of the self. In R.E. Ingram (Ed.), Contemporary psychological approaches to depression: Treatment, research, and theory. New York: Plenum
Abramson, L. Y., Alloy, L. B., & Metalsky, G. I. (1988). The cognitive diathesis-stress theories of depression: Toward an adequate evaluation of the theories' validities. In L.B. Alloy (Ed.), Cognitive processes in depression. New York: Guilford
Abramson, L. Y., Metalsky, G. I., & Alloy, L. B. (1988). The hopelessness theory of depression: Does the research test the theory? In L.Y. Abramson (Ed.), Social cognition and clinical psychology: A synthesis. New York: Guilford
Alloy, L. B., & Abramson, L. Y. (1988). Depressive realism: Four theoretical perspectives. In L.B. Alloy (Ed.), Cognitive processes in depression. New York: Guilford
Alloy, L. B., Hartlage, S., & Abramson, L. Y. (1988). Testing the cognitive diathesis-stress theories of depression: Issues of research design, conceptualization, and assessment. In L.B. Alloy (Ed.), Cognitive processes in depression. New York: Guilford
Alloy, L. B., Abramson, L. Y., & Kossman, D. (1985). The judgment of predictability in depressed and nondepressed college students. In J.B. Overmier and F.R. Brush (Eds.), Affect, conditioning, cognition: Essays on the determinants of behavior. Hillsdale, N.J.: Erlbaum
Halberstadt, L. J., Andrews, D., Metalsky, G. I., & Abramson, L. Y. (1984). Helplessness, hopelessness, and depression: A review of progress and future directions. In N.S. Endler and *J. Hunt (Eds.), Personality and behavior disorders. New York: Wiley
Abramson, L. Y., & Martin, D. J. (1981). Depression and the causal inference process. In J. Harvey, W. Ickes, and R. Kidd (Eds.), New directions in attribution research. Vol. III. Hillsdale, N.J.: Erlbaum
Beach, S., Abramson, L. Y., & Levine, F. (1981). The attributional reformulation of learned helplessness: Therapeutic implications. In H. Glazer and J. Clarkin (Eds.), Depression: Behavioral and directive intervention strategies. New York: Garland
Abramson, L. Y., & Alloy, L. B. (1980). The judgment of contingency: Errors and their implications. In J. Singer and A. Baum (Eds.), Advances in environmental psychology. Vol. II. New York: Erlbaum
Alloy, L. B., & Abramson, L. Y. (1980). The cognitive component of human helplessness and depression: A critical analysis. In J. Garber and M.E.P. Seligman (Eds.), Human helplessness. New York: Academic Press
Garber, J., Abramson, L. Y., & Miller, S. (1980). The relationship between depression and anxiety. In J. Garber and M.E.P. Seligman (Eds.), Human helplessness. New York: Academic Press
Metalsky, G. I., & Abramson, L. Y. (1980). Attributional styles: Toward a framework for conceptualization and assessment. In P.C. Kendall and S.D. Hollon (Eds.), Cognitive-behavioral interventions: Assessment methods. New York: Academic Press
Abramson, L. Y., & Seligman, M. E. P. (1977). Modeling psychopathology in the laboratory: History and rationale. In J. Maser and M.E.P. Seligman (Eds.), Psychopathology: Experimental models. San Francisco: Freeman

See also 
Depressive realism

References

Further reading

External links
 Professor Lyn Abramson homepage at University of Wisconsin–Madison official website

American women psychologists
Social psychologists
University of Wisconsin–Madison alumni
Bipolar disorder researchers
Living people
1950 births
University of Wisconsin–Madison faculty
University of Pennsylvania School of Arts and Sciences alumni
People from Benson, Minnesota
American women academics
21st-century American women
American clinical psychologists